Fernando de Diego (1919–2005) was a Spanish journalist and linguist.

Translated works
The land of Alvargonzález of Antonio Machado ( 1969 )
Gypsy Ballads of Federico Garcia Lorca ( 1971 )
Rhymes Gustavo Adolfo Becquer ( 1972 )
The tree of the knowledge of John Doe ( 1973 )
Doña Bárbara by Rómulo Gallegos ( 1975 )
The Ingenious Hidalgo Don Quixote of La Mancha by Miguel de Cervantes ( 1977 ), released in full version by Esperanto Foundation
Iron bars Incarnation Ferré ( 1983 )
Retrincos of Castelao ( 1983 )
The Family of Pascual Duarte de Camilo Jose Cela ( 1985 )
One Hundred Years of Solitude by Gabriel García Márquez ( 1992 )
The evil Carabel of Wenceslao Fernández Flórez ( 1993 )
Tirano Banderas of Ramón María del Valle-Inclan ( 1993 )
Agriculture in the tropics of Andrés Bello ( 1995 )
Twenty Love Poems and a Song of Despair, by Pablo Neruda ( 1997 )

Other translations have been published in anthologies:
Astura bukedo, an anthology of works by Asturias ( 1987 )
Sentempa simfonio, anthology of Spanish poetry of all time ( 1987 )

People from Guadalajara, Spain
Linguists from Spain
Spanish Esperantists
Writers of Esperanto literature
1919 births
2005 deaths
20th-century linguists
20th-century Spanish journalists